The Wanokaka River is a river in Sumba island, Province of East Nusa Tenggara, Indonesia. It is located a few kilometers south of Waikabubak, with the District of Wanokaka (Wanukaka), east of the District of Lamboya.

Hydrology 
The Wanokaka River flows from east to west before turning to the south into the Indian Ocean at a length of 80 km. The upstream is at the hills Manupeu Tanah Daru National Park, village of Liangudongo, Konda Maloba Utara, District of Katikutana, Central Sumba Regency and discharges into Indian Ocean near Wanokaka Beach in the village of Desa Waihura, District of Wanokaka, West Sumba Regency. The river is famous for two waterfalls, namely Matayangu and Lapopu waterfall.

Tributaries 
Some tributaries flow to this river among others: the Labariri River, Lahihagalang River, Kerimaraga River, Kihi River, Lakaraha River, Waikajelung River, Lokomara  River, and Katamawai River.

Geography 
The river flows along the southern area of Sumba with predominantly tropical savanna climate (designated as As in the Köppen-Geiger climate classification). The annual average temperature in the area is 24 °C. The warmest month is April, when the average temperature is around 26 °C, and the coldest is January, at 22 °C. The average annual rainfall is 1731 mm. The wettest month is December, with an average of 356 mm rainfall, and the driest is August, with 10 mm rainfall.

Uses 
The Wanokaka River is utilized for irrigation with Lahikaninu Weir in West Sumba Regency.

See also 
List of rivers of Indonesia
List of rivers of Lesser Sunda Islands

References 

Rivers of Sumba
Rivers of Indonesia